USS Pickerel (SS-524), a Tench-class submarine, was the second ship of the United States Navy to be named for a young or small pike.

Construction and commissioning
The contract to build Pickerel was awarded to the Boston Navy Yard in Boston, Massachusetts, and her keel was laid down on 8 February 1944. She was launched without a christening ceremony on 15 December 1944. After being towed to the Portsmouth Naval Shipyard in Kittery, Maine, for completion, she was simultaneously christened and commissioned on 4 April 1949, sponsored by Mrs. John R. Moore and commanded by Lieutenant Commander Paul R. Schratz.

Early service

After sea trials, Pickerel departed New London, Connecticut, on 10 August, and headed for Hawaii via East and Gulf coast ports, and the Panama Canal and arrived Pearl Harbor on 28 September where she joined SubDiv 11.

From 16 March to 5 April 1950, Pickerel completed a  voyage from Hong Kong to Pearl Harbor in 21 days while completely submerged, probably the longest distance ever traveled by a submerged diesel-electric submarine. During her first deployment in the Western Pacific in 1950, Pickerel spent four months in the Korean War zone, one of the first submarines to enter the Korean War. Much of Pickerel's early years are documented in Paul R. Schratz memoirs Submarine Commander: A Story of World War II and Korea, where Paul as Pickerel's commissioning captain walks the readers through putting a new modernized GUPPY Tench-class Fleet Submarine through its paces.

Returning to Pearl Harbor in the spring of 1951, Pickerel operated in the Hawaiian area undergoing tests of maximum capabilities, and conducting intensive training until she returned to the Far East in July 1953.

Upon returning to Hawaii early in 1954, Pickerel resumed service for our aircraft and surface anti-submarine forces there and, but for overhaul, continued this important duty until returning to the Western Pacific in June 1955. She returned to Hawaii 1 December.

1960s
Pickerel alternated North Pacific with WestPac duty through 1963 with the exception of a conversion period during 1962 for GUPPY III modernization.

Pickerel operated out of Pearl Harbor during 1964 until 28 December, when she departed en route Yokosuka to begin a WestPac tour as a unit of the Seventh Fleet. In the years that followed, she continued this pattern of alternating services in Hawaii with deployments in the Far East. In the fall of 1966, her duties in WestPac were broadened to include operations in the Vietnam combat zone on Yankee Station.

After a year in Hawaiian waters, Pickerel headed west once more on 16 January 1968. She visited various ports of the Orient before returning to Yankee Station on 8 May. Following service in the combat zone, she reached Pearl Harbor via Japan on 8 July. Her home port was changed to San Diego, California on 1 August and she headed for the West Coast and Naval Shipyard, Hunters Point, on 22 August.

After completing overhaul in the Spring of 1969, Pickerel spent several weeks in the Puget Sound, Washington, area undergoing weapons and sound trials. She headed for Pearl Harbor in late April/early May 1969(?). Pickerel was transferred to SUBLANT/SUBRON 4 and arrived in her new home port of Charleston, South Carolina, on 9 June 1969.

1970s and after
Pickerel transited the Strait of Magellan and Panama Canal as part of that deployment. The deployment started 23 August 1970 and was complete 4 December 1970.

Pickerel was transferred to Italy on 18 August 1972 and stricken from the Naval Vessel Register on 5 December 1977.

Primo Longobardo (S 501)
Some civilian sources disagree as which of them became Primo Longobardo and which became . The United States Department of the Navy's Naval Historical Center maintains that Pickerel became Primo Longobardo (S 501) and Volador became Gianfranco Gazzana Priaroggia. Primo Longobardo was stricken on either 31 January 1980 or 31 May 1981.

References 

{{}}

External links
 Sommergibili Marina Militare website

Tench-class submarines
Ships built in Kittery, Maine
1944 ships
World War II submarines of the United States
Cold War submarines of the United States
Korean War submarines of the United States
Vietnam War submarines of the United States
Tench-class submarines of the Italian Navy